This is a list of accidents in ski flying with confirmed video footage.

Flat-ground crashes

References

External links
Hillside view of Tilen Bartol's crash in Planica on YouTube

Skiing-related lists
Sports-related accidents and incidents
Accidents